Starship Regulars was an animated Macromedia Flash cartoon series created for Icebox by Rob LaZebnik, the producer of The Simpsons, in 1999. It parodied modern science fiction programs such as Star Trek. The series is available at Icebox's website, as well as on Comcast video on demand.

In 2000, Showtime expressed interest in developing a live-action television version.

Setting
Starship Regulars is set aboard the massive Federation starship Integrity in the 24th century. The Integrity is commanded by Captain Bellagen (usually referred to as "The Captain"). The series focuses on three soldiers, Tycho, Wilson and Dave. In contrast to the morality shown by the Captain, Tycho and Wilson are shown to be more interested in "getting laid" or drinking booze.

Voice performers
Starship Regulars had a diverse cast, including:
 Diedrich Bader as Wilson
 Michael Dorn as Captain Bellagen
 Amy Pietz as Mara
 Billy Ragsdale as Tycho
 Karl Wiedergott as Jackson and Blinka
 Megyn Price as Lees
 Tom Kenny as Governor Malaveil and Koraeg Boy
 Tara Strong as Albinor Princess and Kaligian

Episodes
There were ten webisodes of Starship Regulars:
 War  The crew participate in a drinking game as the ship is under attack.
 Hostage  The crew plot how to retrieve a bottle of Cordomite, a rare alcoholic beverage, which was taken hostage with the Captain.
 Raid  As the Captain is tortured, Tycho, Wilson and Dave ingeniously use an old Hughes-transporter to beam up the Cordomite bottle.
 Enemy Engaged  Tycho works hard to pick up a Gerex woman.
 Conquest  Tycho must struggle with whether to have sex with a Gerex woman and possibly die.
 Galien Nation  Tycho struggles with the advances of a male alien ambassador.
 The Ultimate Weapon  The crew are placed in charge of guarding a Koraeg, the Federation's worse enemy. As the Captain contemplates whether to introduce a virus into the Koraeg civilization, the Regulars get him drunk and show him a good time.
 Obsession  Wilson is infatuated with the music of Dido, although his trip to her concert on Rantor 6 may be moved because of a war in the Ashtar Nebula.
 Virgin Territory  Tycho is trusted to guard a beautiful virgin alien princess.
 Untouched  Wilson is treated like a god by the Kaligians, something he uses to satisfy his hunger.

References

External links
 
Starship Regulars producer website
Variety.com review

1999 web series debuts
American adult animated comedy television series
American adult animated science fiction television series
American comic science fiction television series
American flash animated web series
American science fiction web series
American adult animated web series
1999 establishments in the United States